This is a list of countries by easternmost point on land (dependent territories included).

The order does not always reflect the proximity of the country's territory to the 180th meridian. In such a case there would be three both the very westernmost and the very easternmost countries or territories, Russia, Fiji, and Antarctica, as the 180th meridian passes through them on land. Instead, for Russia, New Zealand, Fiji, the United States, and Kiribati, which have territory on both sides of the 180th meridian, the given easternmost point of the country is the easternmost point in the direction of travel. The United States and Kiribati have most of their territory east of the 180th meridian, in the Western Hemisphere, so they are considered to belong to the westernmost countries with their territory stretching as far to the west as beyond the 180th meridian into the Eastern Hemisphere. Conversely, Russia, New Zealand, and Fiji have most of their territory west of the 180th meridian, in the Eastern Hemisphere, so they are considered to belong to the easternmost countries with their territory stretching as far to the east as beyond the 180th meridian into the Western Hemisphere.

See also

Easternmost point
Geography-related lists